Fathia Ayodele Karim is professional doctor. In 2016, she won 12 academic awards for distinguishing herself in her course of study, breaking and setting a new record at the Kwame Nkrumah University of Science and Technology in Kumasi.

Education 
Karim had her secondary level education at the Wesley Girls' Senior High School in Cape Coast. She then proceeded to the Kwame Nkrumah University of Science and Technology where she studied Medicine and was adjourned overall best students during her graduation.

Career 
On Saturday 27 August 2016, during her swearing in as a medical doctor by the Ghana Medical and Dental Council, she was honoured with 12 awards out of 15 awards available for excellent academic distinction.

References

Living people
Ghanaian medical doctors
Kwame Nkrumah University of Science and Technology alumni
21st-century Ghanaian women
Year of birth missing (living people)